The Henry S. Drinker House was constructed in 1902 on the campus of Haverford College.  Located just beyond Founder's Green, the house sits next to Haverford's soccer pitch and across Walton Road from Gummere, which houses freshmen. Drinker was originally built for Haverford professor William Comfort, who became president of the College in 1917, and later served as home to other important professors. In 1961, it was renovated to serve as the school's music building; it was renamed for Henry S. Drinker '00, a former cricket player at Haverford who went on to a distinguished law and academic career and to become a noted musicologist.  

In 1974, Drinker was converted to student housing. The house has two floors and holds 18 residents, traditionally members of the baseball team. It has often hosted for social gatherings and various annual events. The house traditionally holds the first party of the year, known colloquially as "First Drinker," and a holiday party. However, students often prefer the party thrown by the lacrosse team, “Second Drunker”, that is thrown the subsequent weekend. In 2006, Jeffrey Suell '08 organized a Drinker Toy Drive to collect presents for Operation Santa Claus, a charitable organization in Philadelphia that distributes toys to underprivileged children during the holiday season.

See also
 Henry Drinker

References

Haverford College
Houses in Montgomery County, Pennsylvania
School buildings completed in 1902
Drinker family
1902 establishments in Pennsylvania